Route 362, also known as Belleoram Road, is a  north-south highway on the Connaigre Peninsula of the island of Newfoundland. It connects the communities along the western side of Fortune Bay with Route 360 (Bay d'Espoir Highway).

Route description

Route 362 begins at an intersection with Route 360 several kilometres northwest of Pool's Cove. It heads south through very hilly and rural terrain for over 20 kilometres, where it has an intersection with a local road leading into the town. The highway then enters the town of St. Jacques-Coomb's Cove and comes to an intersection with Route 363 (Coomb's Cove Road) just northeast of English Harbour West. The highway now winds its way east to pass through St. Jacques before turning north to leave town and wind its way along the coastline. Route 362 now enters Belleoram and comes to an end in downtown at an intersection with Bayview Drive.

Major intersections

References

362